Radiation exposure may refer to:

 Exposure (radiation), caused by ionizing photons, namely X-rays and gamma rays; or ionizing particles, usually alpha particles, neutrons, protons, or electrons
 Humans being subjected to an ionizing radiation hazard, either by irradiation or contamination
 In modern radiology, and in scientific papers from the early 20th century, radiation exposure may refer to kerma (physics)
 Exposure (photography), photographic film exposure to ionizing radiation
 Any material being subjected to even everyday levels of any type of radiation, such as heat or light
 Radiation Exposure Compensation Act, a federal statute of the United States providing for the monetary compensation of people who contracted cancer and a number of other specified diseases as a direct result of their exposure to radiation under certain circumstances
 Radiation Exposure Monitoring, a system for monitoring exposure

Radiobiology
Radiation effects